
Gmina Kazanów is a rural gmina (administrative district) in Zwoleń County, Masovian Voivodeship, in east-central Poland. Its seat is the village of Kazanów, which lies approximately 12 kilometres (7 mi) south-west of Zwoleń and 110 km (68 mi) south-east of Warsaw.

Villages
Gmina Kazanów contains the villages and settlements of Borów, Dębniak, Dębnica, Dobiec, Kazanów, Kopiec, Kowalków, Kowalków-Kolonia, Kroczów Mniejszy, Kroczów Większy, Miechów, Miechów-Kolonia, Niedarczów Dolny-Kolonia, Niedarczów Dolny-Wieś, Niedarczów Górny-Kolonia, Niedarczów Górny-Wieś, Ostrówka, Ostrownica, Ostrownica-Kolonia, Osuchów, Ruda, Wólka Gonciarska, Zakrzówek and Zakrzówek-Kolonia.

Neighbouring gminas
Gmina Kazanów is bordered by the gminas of Ciepielów, Iłża, Skaryszew, Tczów and Zwoleń.

References
Polish official population figures 2006

Kazanow
Zwoleń County